Jean-Luc Préel (30 October 1940 – 3 September 2015)
was a member of the National Assembly of France.  He represented the Vendée department,  and was a member of the New Centre.

References

1940 births
2015 deaths
The Centrists politicians
Deputies of the 12th National Assembly of the French Fifth Republic
Deputies of the 13th National Assembly of the French Fifth Republic